Morgan High School, also known as Morgan School, is a public high school located in Morgan, Texas, United States. It is the sole high school in the Morgan Independent School District and is classified as a A school by the UIL. In 2015, the school was rated "Improvement Required" by the Texas Education Agency.

Athletics
The Morgan Eagles compete in the following sports:

Basketball
Cross Country
6-Man Football
Golf
Tennis
Track and Field

References

External links
 Official website

Schools in Bosque County, Texas
Public high schools in Texas